The 1919 Rose Bowl, known at the time as the Tournament East-West Football Game, was a bowl game played on January 1, 1919, at Tournament Park in Pasadena, California. It was the 5th Rose Bowl Game. With the war just over, the game was played with players from the Mare Island Marines of California and the Great Lakes Navy from Great Lakes, Illinois.

Teams
With college football teams depleted due to World War I, the Pasadena Tournament of Roses decided to stage the game with military personnel.  With approval from President Woodrow Wilson, they invited the team from the Marine detachment at the Mare Island Naval Base for the second consecutive year, while it was the first appearance by a Navy team from the Naval Station Great Lakes.

Scoring

Game notes
Game MVP and future Pro Football Hall of Fame coach and Chicago Bears owner George Halas holds the Rose Bowl record for the longest non-scoring pass interception return of 77 yards. Halas would comment that he coached players to "dive across the goal" upon reaching the three-yard line, in reference to his interception failing to result in a score, and that "anyone who can't dive three yards should play Parcheesi."

References

Rose Bowl
Rose Bowl Game
Military competitions in American football
1919 in sports in California
January 1919 sports events